Laurie Hendren  (December 13, 1958 – May 27, 2019) was a Canadian computer scientist noted for her research in programming languages and compilers.

Biography
Hendren received a B.Sc. and M.Sc. in computer science from Queen's University, Kingston in 1982 and 1984 respectively. She received a Ph.D in computer science from Cornell University in 1990.

She then joined the School of Computer Science at the McGill University as an assistant professor in 1990. While there she was promoted to associate professor in 1995 and full professor in 2001. She also served as Associate Dean (Academic) for the Faculty of Science at McGill University from 2005 to 2014. In 2014, she became the 5 of diamonds in the Notable Women of Computing card deck.

Awards and notable achievements 
Hendren was awarded the Leo Yaffe Award for Excellence in Teaching in the Faculty of Science at McGill University for the academic year 2006–2007. She was made an ACM Fellow in 2009, awarded a Canada Research Chair in 2011, and elected as a fellow of the Royal Society of Canada in 2012.

Hendren was the programming languages area editor of the Association for Computing Machinery books series and has been the program chair of the Association for Computing Machinery SIGPLAN Programming Language Design and Implementation Conference.

In 2019, Hendren was awarded the senior AITO Dahl-Nygaard Prize, but died before the ECOOP conference at which the prize is usually awarded. It was thus awarded posthumously.

Research projects
Hendren has led or co-led several big open source research projects at McGill University. These are:
 Soot: a framework for analyzing and transforming Java and Android Applications
 SableVM: an open implementation of a Java virtual machine
 abc: the AspectBench Compiler for AspectJ
 McLab: compiler tools for array-based languages
 HIG: health informatics research for radiation oncology

References

External links
 McGill University: Laurie Hendren, School of Computer Science
 Blog: Flat-chested warriors blog about breast cancer and the Goldilocks Mastectomy
 Papers and citations: Google Scholar Profile for Laurie J. Hendren

1958 births
2019 deaths
Canadian women computer scientists
Canadian computer scientists
Fellows of the Association for Computing Machinery
Fellows of the Royal Society of Canada
Cornell University alumni
Academic staff of McGill University
People from Peterborough, Ontario